Klemen Bolha (born 19 March 1993) is a Slovenian football midfielder who plays for Žalgiris in the Lithuanian A Lyga.

References

External links
PrvaLiga profile 

1993 births
Living people
Slovenian footballers
Association football midfielders
Slovenian PrvaLiga players
NK Rudar Velenje players
Slovenian expatriate footballers
Slovenian expatriate sportspeople in Lithuania
Expatriate footballers in Lithuania
FK Žalgiris players
A Lyga players